RK Vrbas is a Serbian handball club based in Vrbas. They compete in the Serbian Handball Super B League.

History
The club was established in 1955. They made their Yugoslav Handball Championship debut in the 1988–89 season. The club reached the EHF Cup round of 16 in the 1995–96 season. They competed in the Serbian Handball Super League from 2006 to 2008 and from 2012 to 2014.

Sponsorship
During its history, the club has been known by a variety of names due to sponsorship reasons:
 Vrbas Figrad
 Vrbas Vital
 Vrbas Carnex
 Vrbas Petrol

Notable players
The list includes players who played for their respective national teams in any major international tournaments, such as the Olympic Games, World Championships and European Championships:

  Golub Doknić
  Šandor Hodik
  Uroš Elezović
  Miloš Orbović
  Aleksandar Stojanović
  Goran Arsenić
  Jovan Kovačević
  Dragan Momić
  Jovica Elezović
  Drago Jovović

Head coaches
  Branislav Kustudić
  Jovica Elezović
  Vladimir Vojvodić
  Veselin Kilibarda

References

External links
  
 RK Vrbas – EHF competition record
 RK Vrbas at srbijasport.net 

Vrbas
Handball clubs established in 1955
1955 establishments in Yugoslavia
Sport in Vrbas, Serbia